The 2015–16 season was Milton Keynes Dons's 12th season in their existence, and their first season in the Championship, the second tier of English football, having gained promotion from League One the previous season.

Along with competing in the Championship, the club also participated in the FA Cup and League Cup.

The season covers the period from 1 July 2015 to 30 June 2016.

Competitions

Championship

Final table

Source: Sky Sports

Matches

FA Cup

Matches

League Cup

Matches

Player details
 Note: Players' ages as of the club's opening fixture of the 2015–16 season.

Transfers

Transfers in

Transfers out

Loans in

Loans out

References

External links

Official Supporters Association website
MK Dons news on MKWeb

Milton Keynes Dons
Milton Keynes Dons F.C. seasons